Events from the year 1979 in Sweden

Incumbents
 Monarch – Carl XVI Gustaf 
 Prime Minister – Ola Ullsten, Thorbjörn Fälldin

Events
 23 February – The comedy film Repmånad, directed by Lasse Åberg, was released in Sweden.
23 April – the ABBA album Voulez-Vous released.
1 July – Sveriges Television is separated from Sveriges Radio.
16 September – The 1979 Swedish general election is held.
12 October – Ola Ullsten resigns as Prime Minister of Sweden, and is replaced with Thorbjörn Fälldin.
Date unknown – 1979 Star World Championships (sailing regatta) are held in Marstrand.

Music
Date unknown – Sun Cats Swedish rock & roll band is founded.

Film

Births

 29 January – Andreas Thorstensson, entrepreneur
 2 April – Mika Hannula, ice hockey player.
 13 May – Prince Carl Philip, Duke of Värmland
 24 May – Dalibor Doder, handballer.
 2 October – Maja Ivarsson, singer-songwriter.

Deaths
 4 August – Ivar Johansson, wrestler (born 1903).
 31 October – Edvin Adolphson, film actor and director (born 1893).

References

 
Sweden
Years of the 20th century in Sweden